At least two ships of the French Navy have been named Épée:

 , a  launched in 1900 and sold for scrap in 1921
 , a  launched in 1938, she was renamed L'Adroit in 1941 and scuttled in 1942

French Navy ship names